William Penn ( – ) was an English writer and religious thinker belonging to the Religious Society of Friends (Quakers), and founder of the Province of Pennsylvania, a North American colony of England. He was an early advocate of democracy and religious freedom, notable for his good relations and successful treaties with the Lenape Native Americans.

In 1681, King Charles II handed over a large piece of his North American land holdings along the North Atlantic Ocean coast to Penn to pay the debts the king had owed to Penn's father, the admiral and politician Sir William Penn. This land included the present-day states of Pennsylvania and Delaware. Penn immediately set sail and took his first step on American soil, sailing up the Delaware Bay and Delaware River, past earlier Swedish and Dutch riverfront colonies, in New Castle (now in Delaware) in 1682. On this occasion, the colonists pledged allegiance to Penn as their new proprietor, and the first Pennsylvania General Assembly was held. Afterward, Penn journeyed further north up the Delaware River and founded Philadelphia, on the west bank. However, Penn's Quaker government was not viewed favorably by the previous Dutch and Swedish colonists, and earlier English settlers in what is now Delaware, but claimed for half a century by the neighboring Province of Maryland's proprietor family, the Calverts and Lord Baltimore. These earlier colonists had no historical allegiance to a "Pennsylvania", so they almost immediately began petitioning for their own representative assembly. Twenty-three years later in 1704, they achieved their goal when the three southernmost counties of provincial Pennsylvania along the western coast of the Delaware were permitted to split off and become the new semi-autonomous colony of Lower Delaware. As the most prominent, prosperous and influential settlement in the new colony, New Castle, the original Swedish colony town became the capital.

As one of the earlier supporters of colonial unification, Penn wrote and urged for a union of all the English colonies in what was to become the United States of America. The democratic principles that he included in the West Jersey Concessions, and set forth in the Pennsylvania Frame of Government served as an inspiration for the members of the convention framing the new U.S. Constitution in Philadelphia in 1787.

A man of deep religious convictions, Penn wrote numerous works in which he exhorted believers to adhere to the spirit of Primitive Christianity. He was imprisoned several times in the Tower of London due to his faith, and his book No Cross, No Crown (1669), which he wrote while in prison, has become a Christian classic of theological literature.

Biography

Early years

Penn was born in 1644 at Tower Hill, London, the son of English naval officer Sir William Penn, and Dutchwoman Margaret Jasper, who was widow of a Dutch sea captain and the daughter of a rich merchant from Rotterdam. Admiral Penn served in the Commonwealth Navy during the War of the Three Kingdoms and was rewarded by Oliver Cromwell with estates in Ireland. The lands given to Penn were confiscated from Irish Confederates who participated in the Irish Rebellion of 1641. Admiral Penn took part in the restoration of King Charles II and was eventually knighted and served in the Royal Navy. At the time of his son's birth, then-Captain Penn was twenty-three and an ambitious naval officer in charge of blockading ports held by Confederate forces.

Penn grew up during the rule of Oliver Cromwell, who succeeded in leading a Puritan rebellion against King Charles I; the king was beheaded when Penn was four years old. Penn's father was often at sea. Little William caught smallpox at a young age, losing all his hair (he wore a wig until he left college), prompting his parents to move from the suburbs to an estate in Essex. The country life made a lasting impression on young Penn, and kindled in him a love of horticulture. Their neighbor was famed diarist Samuel Pepys, who was friendly at first but later secretly hostile to the Admiral, perhaps embittered in part by his failed seductions of both Penn's mother and his sister Peggy.

Penn was educated first at Chigwell School, by private tutors whilst in Ireland, and later at Christ Church, Oxford. At that time, there were no state schools and nearly all educational institutions were affiliated with the Anglican Church. Children from poor families had to have a wealthy sponsor to get an education. Penn's education heavily leaned on the classical authors and "no novelties or conceited modern writers" were allowed including William Shakespeare. Foot racing was Penn's favorite sport, and he would often run the more than three-mile (5 km) distance from his home to the school. The school itself was cast in an Anglican mode – strict, humorless, and somber – and teachers had to be pillars of virtue and provide sterling examples to their charges. Though later opposing Anglicanism on religious grounds, Penn absorbed many Puritan behaviors, and was known later for his serious demeanor, strict behavior and lack of humor.

After a failed mission to the Caribbean, Admiral Penn and his family were exiled to his lands in Ireland. It was during this period, when Penn was about fifteen, that he met Thomas Loe, a Quaker missionary, who was maligned by both Catholics and Protestants. Loe was admitted to the Penn household and during his discourses on the "Inner Light", young Penn recalled later that "the Lord visited me and gave me divine Impressions of Himself."

A year later, Cromwell was dead, the royalists resurging, and the Penn family returned to England. The middle class aligned itself with the royalists and Admiral Penn was sent on a secret mission to bring back exiled Prince Charles. For his role in restoring the monarchy, Admiral Penn was knighted and gained a powerful position as Lord Commissioner of the Admiralty.

In 1660, Penn arrived at Oxford and enrolled as a gentleman scholar with an assigned servant. The student body was a volatile mix of swashbuckling Cavaliers (aristocratic Anglicans), sober Puritans, and nonconforming Quakers. The new government's discouragement of religious dissent gave the Cavaliers the license to harass the minority groups. Because of his father's high position and social status, young Penn was firmly a Cavalier but his sympathies lay with the persecuted Quakers. To avoid conflict, he withdrew from the fray and became a reclusive scholar. Also at this time, Penn was developing his individuality and philosophy of life. He found that he was not in sympathy with either his father's martial view of the world or his mother's society-oriented sensibilities, "I had no relations that inclined to so solitary and spiritual way; I was a child alone. A child was given to musing, occasionally feeling the divine presence."

Penn returned home for the extraordinary splendor of the King's restoration ceremony and was a guest of honor alongside his father, who received a highly unusual royal salute for his services to the Crown. Though undetermined at the time, the Admiral had great hopes for his son's career under the favor of the King. Back at Oxford, Penn considered a medical career and took some dissecting classes. Rational thought began to spread into science, politics, and economics, which he took a liking to. When theologian John Owen was fired from his deanery, Penn and other open-minded students rallied to his side and attended seminars at the dean's house, where intellectual discussions covered the gamut of new thought. Penn learned the valuable skills of forming ideas into theory, discussing theory through reasoned debate, and testing the theories in the real world.

At this time he also faced his first moral dilemma. After Owen was censured again after being fired, students were threatened with punishment for associating with him. However, Penn stood by the dean, thereby gaining a fine and reprimand from the university. The Admiral, despairing of the charges, pulled young Penn away from Oxford, hoping to distract him from the heretical influences of the university. The attempt had no effect and father and son struggled to understand each other. Back at school, the administration imposed stricter religious requirements including daily chapel attendance and required dress. Penn rebelled against enforced worship and was expelled. His father, in a rage, attacked young Penn with a cane and forced him from their home. Penn's mother made peace in the family, which allowed her son to return home but she quickly concluded that both her social standing and her husband's career were being threatened by their son's behavior. So at age 18, young Penn was sent to Paris to get him out of view, improve his manners, and expose him to another culture.

In Paris, at the court of young Louis XIV, Penn found French manners far more refined than the coarse manners of his countrymen – but the extravagant display of wealth and privilege did not sit well with him. Though impressed by Notre Dame and the Catholic ritual, he felt uncomfortable with it. Instead, he sought out spiritual direction from French Protestant theologian Moise Amyraut, who invited Penn to stay with him in Saumur for a year. The undogmatic Christian humanist talked of a tolerant, adapting view of religion which appealed to Penn, who later stated, "I never had any other religion in my life than what I felt." By adapting his mentor's belief in free will, Penn felt unburdened of Puritanical guilt and rigid beliefs and was inspired to search out his own religious path.

Upon returning to England after two years abroad, he presented to his parents a mature, sophisticated, well-mannered, "modish" gentleman, though Samuel Pepys noted young Penn's "vanity of the French". Penn had developed a taste for fine clothes, and for the rest of his life would pay somewhat more attention to his dress than most Quakers. The Admiral had great hopes that his son then had the practical sense and the ambition necessary to succeed as an aristocrat. He had young Penn enroll in law school but soon his studies were interrupted. With warfare with the Dutch imminent, young Penn decided to shadow his father at work and join him at sea. Penn functioned as an emissary between his father and the King, then returned to his law studies. Worrying about his father in battle he wrote, "I never knew what a father was till I had wisdom enough to prize him... I pray God... that you come home secure." The Admiral returned triumphantly but London was in the grip of the plague of 1665. Young Penn reflected on the suffering and the deaths, and the way humans reacted to the epidemic. He wrote that the scourge "gave me a deep sense of the vanity of this World, of the Irreligiousness of the Religions in it." Further he observed how Quakers on errands of mercy were arrested by the police and demonized by other religions, even accused of causing the plague.

With his father laid low by gout, young Penn was sent to Ireland in 1666 to manage the family landholdings. While there he became a soldier and took part in suppressing a local Irish rebellion. Swelling with pride, he had his portrait painted wearing a suit of armor, his most authentic likeness. His first experience of warfare gave him the sudden idea of pursuing a military career, but the fever of battle soon wore off after his father discouraged him, "I can say nothing but advise to sobriety...I wish your youthful desires mayn't outrun your discretion." While Penn was abroad, the Great Fire of 1666 consumed central London. As with the plague, the Penn family was spared. But after returning to the city, Penn was depressed by the mood of the city and his ailing father, so he went back to the family estate in Ireland to contemplate his future. The reign of King Charles had further tightened restrictions against all religious sects other than the Anglican Church, making the penalty for unauthorized worship imprisonment or deportation. The "Five Mile Act" prohibited dissenting teachers and preachers to come within that distance of any borough. The Quakers were especially targeted and their meetings were deemed undesirable.

Religious conversion
Despite the dangers, Penn began to attend Quaker meetings near Cork. A chance re-meeting with Thomas Loe confirmed Penn's rising attraction to Quakerism. Soon Penn was arrested for attending Quaker meetings. Rather than state that he was not a Quaker and thereby dodge any charges, he publicly declared himself a member and finally joined the Quakers at the age of 22. In pleading his case, Penn stated that since the Quakers had no political agenda (unlike the Puritans) they should not be subject to laws that restricted political action by minority religions and other groups. Sprung from jail because of his family's rank rather than his argument, Penn was immediately recalled to London by his father. The Admiral was severely distressed by his son's actions and took the conversion as a personal affront. His father's hopes that Penn's charisma and intelligence would win him favor at the court were crushed. Though enraged, the Admiral tried his best to reason with his son but to no avail. His father not only feared for his own position but that his son seemed bent on a dangerous confrontation with the Crown. In the end, young Penn was more determined than ever, and the Admiral felt he had no option but to order his son out of the house and to withhold his inheritance.

As Penn became homeless, he began to live with Quaker families. Quakers were relatively strict Christians in the 17th century. They refused to bow or take off their hats to social superiors, believing all men equal under God, a belief antithetical to an absolute monarchy that believed the monarch divinely appointed by God. Therefore, Quakers were treated as heretics because of their principles and their failure to pay tithes. They also refused to swear oaths of loyalty to the King believing that this was following the command of Jesus not to swear. The basic ceremony of Quakerism was silent worship in a meeting house, conducted in a group. There was no ritual and no professional clergy, and many Quakers disavowed the concept of original sin. God's communication came to each individual directly, and if so moved, the individual shared his revelations, thoughts, or opinions with the group. Penn found all these tenets to sit well with his conscience and his heart.

Penn became a close friend of George Fox, the founder of the Quakers, whose movement started in the 1650s during the tumult of the Cromwellian revolution. The times sprouted many new sects besides Quakers, including Seekers, Ranters, Antinomians, Seventh Day Baptists, Soul sleepers, Adamites, Diggers, Levellers, Behmenists, Muggletonians, and many others, as the Puritans were more tolerant than the monarchy had been. Following Oliver Cromwell's death, however, the Crown was re-established and the King responded with harassment and persecution of all religions and sects other than Anglicanism. Fox risked his life, wandering from town to town, and he attracted followers who likewise believed that the "God who made the world did not dwell in temples made with hands." By abolishing the church's authority over the congregation, Fox not only extended the Protestant Reformation more radically, but he helped extend the most important principle of modern political history – the rights of the individual – upon which modern democracies were later founded. Penn traveled frequently with Fox, through Europe and England. He also wrote a comprehensive, detailed explanation of Quakerism along with a testimony to the character of George Fox, in his introduction to the autobiographical Journal of George Fox. In effect, Penn became the first theologian, theorist, and legal defender of Quakerism, providing its written doctrine and helping to establish its public standing.

Penn in Ireland (1669–1670)
In 1669, Penn traveled to Ireland to deal with many of his father's estates. While there, he attended many meetings and stayed with leading Quaker families. He became a great friend of William Morris, a leading Quaker figure in Cork, and often stayed with Morris at Castle Salem near Rosscarbery.

Penn in Germany (1671–1677)
Between 1671 and 1677 William Penn made trips to Germany on behalf of the Quaker faith, resulting in a German Settlement in Pennsylvania that was symbolic in two ways: it was a specifically German-speaking congregation, and it comprised religious dissenters. Pennsylvania has remained the heartland for various branches of Anabaptists: Old Order Mennonites, Ephrata Cloister, Brethren, and Amish. Pennsylvania also became home for many Lutheran refugees from Catholic provinces (e.g., Salzburg), as well as for German Catholics who had also been discriminated against in their home country.

In Philadelphia, Francis Daniel Pastorius negotiated the purchase of 15,000 acres (61 km2) from his friend William Penn, the proprietor of the colony, and laid out the settlement of Germantown. The German Society of Pennsylvania was established in 1764 and is still functioning today from its headquarters in Philadelphia.

Persecutions and imprisonments

Penn's first of many pamphlets, Truth Exalted: To Princes, Priests, and People (1668), was a criticism of all religious groups, except Quakers, which he perceived as the only true Christian group living at that time in England. He branded the Catholic Church as "the Whore of Babylon", defied the Church of England, and called the Puritans "hypocrites and revelers in God". He also lambasted all "false prophets, tithemongers, and opposers of perfection". Pepys thought it a "ridiculous nonsensical book" that he was "ashamed to read".

In 1668 Penn was imprisoned in the Tower of London after writing a follow-up tract entitled The Sandy Foundation Shaken. The Bishop of London ordered that Penn be held indefinitely until he publicly recanted his written statements. The official charge was publication without a licence but the real crime was blasphemy, as signed in a warrant by King Charles II. Placed in solitary confinement in an unheated cell and threatened with a life sentence, Penn was being accused of denying the Trinity, though this was a misinterpretation Penn himself refuted in the essay Innocency with her open face, presented by way of Apology for the book entitled The Sandy Foundation Shaken, where he himself proceeded to prove the Godhead of Christ. Penn said the rumor had been "maliciously insinuated" by detractors who wanted to create a bad reputation to Quakers. Later, he stated that what he really denied were the Catholic interpretations of this theological topic, and the use of unbiblical concepts to explain it. Penn expressly confessed he believed in the Holy Three as well as in the divinity of Christ. In 1668 in a letter to the anti-Quaker minister Jonathan Clapham,  Penn wrote: "Thou must not, reader, from my querying thus, conclude we do deny (as he hath falsely charged us) those glorious Three, which bear record in heaven, the Father, Word, and Spirit; neither the infinity, eternity and divinity of Jesus Christ; for that we know he is the mighty God."

Given writing materials in the hope that he would put on paper his retraction, Penn wrote another inflammatory treatise, No Cross, No Crown: A Discourse Shewing The Nature and Discipline of the Holy Cross of Christ and that the Denial of Self, and Daily Hearing of Christ's Cross, is the Alone Way to Rest and Kingdom of God. In it, Penn exhorted believers to adhere to the spirit of Primitive Christianity. This work was remarkable for its historical analysis and citation of 68 authors whose quotations and commentary he had committed to memory and was able to summon without any reference material at hand. Penn petitioned for an audience with the King, which was denied but which led to negotiations on his behalf by one of the royal chaplains. Penn bravely declared, "My prison shall be my grave before I will budge a jot: for I owe my conscience to no mortal man." He was released after eight months of imprisonment.

Penn demonstrated no remorse for his aggressive stance and vowed to keep fighting against the wrongs of the Church and the King. For its part, the Crown continued to confiscate Quaker property and jailed thousands of Quakers. From then on, Penn's religious views effectively exiled him from English society; he was sent down (expelled) from Christ Church, a college at Oxford University, for being a Quaker, and was arrested several times. Among the most famous of these events was the trial following his 1670 arrest with William Mead. Penn was accused of preaching before a gathering in the street, which Penn had deliberately provoked to test the validity of the 1664 Conventicle Act, just renewed in 1670, which denied the right of assembly to "more than five persons in addition to members of the family, for any religious purpose not according to the rules of the Church of England". Penn was assisted by his solicitor, Thomas Rudyard, an eminent London Quaker lawyer, and pleaded for his right to see a copy of the charges laid against him and the laws he had supposedly broken, but the Recorder of London, Sir John Howel, on the bench as chief judge, refused, although this was a right guaranteed by law. Furthermore, the Recorder directed the jury to come to a verdict without hearing the defense.

Despite heavy pressure from Howel to convict Penn, the jury returned a verdict of "not guilty". When invited by the Recorder to reconsider their verdict and to select a new foreman, they refused and were sent to a cell over several nights to mull over their decision. The Lord Mayor of London, Sir Samuel Starling, also on the bench, then told the jury, "You shall go together and bring in another verdict, or you shall starve", and not only had Penn sent to jail in Newgate Prison (on a charge of contempt of court for refusing to remove his hat), but the full jury followed him, and they were additionally fined the equivalent of a year's wages each. The members of the jury, fighting their case from prison in what became known as Bushel's Case, managed to win the right for all English juries to be free from the control of judges. This case was one of the more important trials that shaped the concept of jury nullification and was a victory for the use of the writ of habeas corpus as a means of freeing those unlawfully detained.

With his father dying, Penn wanted to see him one more time and patch up their differences. But he urged his father not to pay his fine and free him, "I entreat thee not to purchase my liberty." But the Admiral refused to let the opportunity pass and he paid the fine, releasing his son.

The old man had gained respect for his son's integrity and courage and told him, "Let nothing in this world tempt you to wrong your conscience." The Admiral also knew that after his death young Penn would become more vulnerable in his pursuit of justice. In an act which not only secured his son's protection but also set the conditions for the founding of Pennsylvania, the Admiral wrote to the Duke of York, the heir to the throne.

The Duke and the King, in return for the Admiral's lifetime of service to the Crown, promised to protect young Penn and make him a royal counselor.

Penn was not disinherited and he came into a large fortune but found himself in jail again for six months as he continued to agitate. After gaining his freedom, he finally married Gulielma Springett in April 1672, after a four-year engagement filled with frequent separations. Penn stayed close to home but continued writing his tracts, espousing religious tolerance and railing against discriminatory laws. A minor split developed in the Quaker community between those who favored Penn's analytical formulations and those who preferred Fox's simple precepts. But the persecution of Quakers had accelerated and the differences were overridden; Penn again resumed missionary work in Holland and Germany.

Founding of Pennsylvania

Seeing conditions deteriorating, Penn decided to appeal directly to the King and the Duke. Penn proposed a solution which would solve the dilemma—a mass emigration of English Quakers. Some Quakers had already moved to North America, but the New England Puritans, especially, were as hostile towards Quakers as Anglicans in England were, and some of the Quakers had been banished to the Caribbean. In 1677 a group of prominent Quakers that included Penn purchased the colonial province of West Jersey (half of the current state of New Jersey). That same year, two hundred settlers from the towns of Chorleywood and Rickmansworth in Hertfordshire and other towns in nearby Buckinghamshire arrived, and founded the town of Burlington. George Fox himself had made a journey to America to verify the potential of further expansion of the early Quaker settlements. In 1682 East Jersey was also purchased by Quakers.

With the New Jersey foothold in place, Penn pressed his case to extend the Quaker region. Penn became the sole proprietor of a huge tract of land west of New Jersey and north of Maryland (which belonged to Lord Baltimore), and gained sovereign rule of the territory with all rights and privileges (except the power to declare war). The land of Pennsylvania had belonged to the Duke of York, who acquiesced, but he retained New York and the area around New Castle and the Eastern portion of the Delmarva Peninsula. In return, one-fifth of all gold and silver mined in the province (which had virtually none) was to be remitted to the King, and the Crown was freed of a debt to the Admiral of £16,000, equal to roughly £ in 2008.

Penn first called the area "New Wales", then "Sylvania" (Latin for "forests" or "woods"), which King Charles II changed to "Pennsylvania" in honor of the elder Penn. On 4 March 1681, the King signed the charter and the following day Penn jubilantly wrote, "It is a clear and just thing, and my God who has given it to me through many difficulties, will, I believe, bless and make it the seed of a nation." Penn then traveled to America and while there, he negotiated Pennsylvania's first land-purchase survey with the tribe of the Lenape people.  Penn purchased the first tract of land under a white oak tree at Graystones on 15 July 1682. Penn drafted a charter of liberties for the settlement creating a political utopia guaranteeing free and fair trial by jury, freedom of religion, freedom from unjust imprisonment and free elections.

Having proved himself an influential scholar and theoretician, Penn now had to demonstrate the practical skills of a real estate promoter, city planner, and governor for his "Holy Experiment", the province of Pennsylvania.

Besides achieving his religious goals, Penn had hoped that Pennsylvania would be a profitable venture for himself and his family. But he proclaimed that he would not exploit either the natives or the immigrants, "I would not abuse His love, nor act unworthy of His providence, and so defile what came to me clean." To that end, Penn's land purchase from the Lenape included the latter party's retained right to traverse the sold lands for purposes of hunting, fishing, and gathering. Though thoroughly oppressed, getting Quakers to leave England and make the dangerous journey to the New World was his first commercial challenge. Some Quaker families had already arrived in Maryland and New Jersey but the numbers were small. To attract settlers in large numbers, he wrote a glowing prospectus, considered honest and well-researched for the time, promising religious freedom as well as material advantage, which he marketed throughout Europe in various languages. Within six months he had parcelled out  to over 250 prospective settlers, mostly rich London Quakers. Eventually he attracted other persecuted minorities including Huguenots, Mennonites, Amish, Catholics, Lutherans, and Jews from England, France, Holland, Germany, Sweden, Finland, Ireland, and Wales.

Next, he set out to lay the legal framework for an ethical society where power was derived from the people, from "open discourse", in much the same way as a Quaker Meeting was run. Notably, as the sovereign, Penn thought it important to limit his own power as well. The new government would have two houses, safeguard the rights of private property and free enterprise, and impose taxes fairly. It would call for death for only two crimes, treason and murder, rather than the two hundred crimes under English law, and all cases were to be tried before a jury. Prisons would be progressive, attempting to correct through "workshops" rather than through hellish confinement. The laws of behaviour he laid out were rather Puritanical: swearing, lying, and drunkenness were forbidden as well as "idle amusements" such as stage plays, gambling, revels, masques, cock-fighting, and bear-baiting.

All this was a radical departure from the laws and the lawmaking of European monarchs and elites. Over twenty drafts, Penn laboured to create his "Framework of Government", with the assistance of Thomas Rudyard (especially for the final six drafts), the London Quaker lawyer who had assisted his defence during the Penn-Mead case in 1670, and was later deputy-governor of East New Jersey. He borrowed liberally from John Locke who later had a similar influence on Thomas Jefferson, but added his own revolutionary idea—the use of amendments—to enable a written framework that could evolve with the changing times. He stated, "Governments, like clocks, go from the motion men give them." Penn hoped that an amendable constitution would accommodate dissent and new ideas and also allow meaningful societal change without resorting to violent uprisings or revolution. Remarkably, though the Crown reserved the right to override any law it wished, Penn's skillful stewardship did not provoke any government reaction while Penn remained in his province. Despite criticism by some Quaker friends that Penn was setting himself above them by taking on this powerful position, and by his enemies who thought he was a fraud and "falsest villain upon earth", Penn was ready to begin the "Holy Experiment". Bidding goodbye to his wife and children, he reminded them to "avoid pride, avarice, and luxury".

Under Penn's direction, the city of Philadelphia was planned and developed. Philadelphia was planned out to be grid-like with its streets and be very easy to navigate, unlike London. The streets are named with numbers and tree names.

Back to England

In 1684 Penn returned to England to see his family and to try to resolve a territorial dispute with Lord Baltimore.
Penn did not always pay attention to details and had not taken the fairly simple step of determining where the 40th degree of latitude (the southern boundary of his land under the charter) actually was. After he sent letters to several landowners in Maryland advising the recipients that they were probably in Pennsylvania and not to pay any more taxes to Lord Baltimore, trouble arose between the two proprietors. This led to an eighty-year legal dispute between the two families.

Political conditions at home had stiffened since Penn left. To his dismay, he found Bridewell and Newgate prisons filled with Quakers. Internal political conflicts even threatened to undo the Pennsylvania charter. Penn withheld his political writings from publication as "The times are too rough for print."

In 1685 King Charles died, and the Duke of York was crowned James II. The new king resolved the border dispute in Penn's favor. But King James, a Catholic with a largely Protestant parliament, proved a poor ruler, stubborn and inflexible. Penn supported James' Declaration of Indulgence, which granted toleration to Quakers, and went on a "preaching tour through England to promote the King's Indulgence". His proposal at the London Yearly Meeting of the Society of Friends in June 1688 to establish an "advisory committee that might offer counsel to individual Quakers deciding whether to take up public office" under James II was rebuffed by George Fox, who argued that it was "not safe to conclude such things in a Yearly Meeting".  Penn offered some assistance to James II's campaign to regulate the parliamentary constituencies by sending a letter to a friend in Huntingdon asking him to identify men who could be trusted to support the king's campaign for liberty of conscience.

Penn faced serious problems in the colonies due to his sloppy business practices. Apparently, he could not be bothered with administrative details, and his business manager, fellow Quaker Philip Ford, embezzled substantial sums from Penn's estates. Ford capitalized on Penn's habit of signing papers without reading them. One such paper turned out to be a deed transferring ownership of Pennsylvania to Ford who then demanded a rent beyond Penn's ability to pay.

Return to America

After agreeing to let Ford keep all his Irish rents in exchange for keeping quiet about Ford's legal title to Pennsylvania, Penn felt his situation sufficiently improved to return to Pennsylvania with the intention of staying. Accompanied by his wife Hannah, daughter Letitia and secretary James Logan, Penn sailed from the Isle of Wight on the Canterbury, reaching Philadelphia in December 1699.

Penn received a hearty welcome upon his arrival and found his province much changed in the intervening 18 years. Pennsylvania was growing rapidly and now had nearly 18,100 inhabitants and Philadelphia over 3,000. His tree plantings were providing the green urban spaces he had envisioned. Shops were full of imported merchandise, satisfying the wealthier citizens and proving America to be a viable market for English goods. Most importantly, religious diversity was succeeding. Despite the protests of fundamentalists and farmers, Penn's insistence that Quaker grammar schools be open to all citizens was producing a relatively educated workforce. High literacy and open intellectual discourse led to Philadelphia becoming a leader in science and medicine. Quakers were especially modern in their treatment of mental illness, decriminalizing insanity and turning away from punishment and confinement.

Ironically, the tolerant Penn transformed himself almost into a Puritan, in an attempt to control the fractiousness that had developed in his absence, tightening up some laws. Another change was found in Penn's writings, which had mostly lost their boldness and vision. In those years, he did put forward a plan to make a federation of all English colonies in America. There have been claims that he also fought slavery, but that seems unlikely, as he owned and even traded slaves himself and his writings do not support that idea. However, he did promote good treatment for slaves, including marriage among slaves (though rejected by the council). Other Pennsylvania Quakers were more outspoken and proactive, being among the earliest fighters against slavery in America, led by Daniel Pastorius, founder of Germantown, Pennsylvania. Many Quakers pledged to release their slaves upon their death, including Penn, and some sold their slaves to non-Quakers.

The Penns lived comfortably at Pennsbury Manor and had all intentions of living out their lives there. They also had a residence in Philadelphia. Their only American child, John, had been born and was thriving. Penn was commuting to Philadelphia on a six-man barge, which he admitted he prized above "all dead things".

James Logan, his secretary, kept him acquainted with all the news. Penn had plenty of time to spend with his family and still attend to affairs of state, though delegations and official visitors were frequent. His wife, however, did not enjoy life as a governor's wife and hostess and preferred the simple life she led in England. When new threats by France again put Penn's charter in jeopardy, Penn decided to return to England with his family, in 1701.

Later years
Penn returned to England and immediately became embroiled in financial and family troubles. His eldest son William, Jr. was leading a dissolute life, neglecting his wife and two children, and running up gambling debts. Penn had hoped to have William succeed him in America. Now he could not even pay his son's debts. His own finances were in turmoil. He had sunk over £30,000 in America and received little back except for some bartered goods. He had made many generous loans which he failed to press.

Making matters worse from Penn's perspective, Philip Ford, his financial advisor, had cheated Penn out of thousands of pounds by concealing and diverting rents from Penn's Irish lands, claiming losses, then extracting loans from Penn to cover the shortfall. When Ford died in 1702, his widow Bridget threatened to sell Pennsylvania, to which she claimed title. Penn sent William to America to manage affairs, but he proved just as unreliable as he had been in England. There were considerable discussions about scrapping his constitution. In desperation, Penn tried to sell Pennsylvania to the Crown before Bridget Ford got wind of his plan, but by insisting that the Crown uphold the civil liberties that had been achieved, he could not strike a deal. Mrs. Ford took her case to court. At age 62, Penn landed in debtors' prison; however, a rush of sympathy reduced Penn's punishment to house arrest, and Bridget Ford was finally denied her claim to Pennsylvania. A group of Quakers arranged for Ford to receive payment for back rents and Penn was released.

In 1712 Berkeley Codd, Esq. of Sussex County, Delaware disputed some of the rights of Penn's grant from the Duke of York. Some of William Penn's agents hired lawyer Andrew Hamilton to represent the Penn family in this replevin case. Hamilton's success led to an established relationship of goodwill between the Penn family and Andrew Hamilton. Penn had grown weary of the politicking back in Pennsylvania and the restlessness with his governance, but Logan implored him not to forsake his colony, for fear that Pennsylvania might fall into the hands of an opportunist who would undo all the good that had been accomplished. During his second attempt to sell Pennsylvania back to the Crown in 1712, Penn suffered a stroke. A second stroke several months later left him unable to speak or take care of himself. He slowly lost his memory.

William Penn died penniless in 1718, at his home in Ruscombe, near Twyford in Berkshire, and is buried in a grave next to his first wife in the cemetery of the Jordans Quaker meeting house near Chalfont St Giles in Buckinghamshire. His wife, as sole executor, became the de facto proprietor until she died in 1726.

Family
Penn first married Gulielma Maria Posthuma Springett (1644–1694), daughter of William S. Springett (the Posthuma in her name indicating that her father had died prior to her birth) and Lady Mary Proude Penington. They had three sons and five daughters:
 Gulielma Maria (23 January 1673 – 17 May 1673) 
 William and Mary (or Maria Margaret) (twins) (born February 1674 and died May 1674 and December 1674) 
 Springett (25 January 1675 – 10 April 1696)  
 Letitia (1 March 1678 – 6 April 1746), who married William Awbrey (Aubrey)  
 William, Jr. (14 March 1681 – 23 June 1720) 
 Unnamed child (born March 1683 and died April 1683)
 Gulielma Maria (November 1685–November 1689) 

Two years after Gulielma's death he married Hannah Margaret Callowhill (1671–1726), daughter of Thomas Callowhill and Anna (Hannah) Hollister. William Penn married Hannah when she was 25 and he was 52. They had nine children in twelve years:

 Unnamed daughter (born and died 1697) 
 John Penn (28 January 1700 – 25 October 1746), never married. 
 Thomas Penn (20 March 1702 – 21 March 1775), married Lady Juliana Fermor, fourth daughter of Thomas, first Earl of Pomfret.
 Hannah Penn (1703–1706) 
 Margaret Penn (7 November 1704–February 1751), married Thomas Freame (1701/02-1746) nephew of John Freame, founder of Barclays Bank
Richard Penn Sr. (17 January 1706 – 4 February 1771) 
 Dennis Penn (26 February 1707 – 1723)  
 Hannah Margarita Penn (1708–March 1708)
 Louis Penn

Legacy

According to Mary Maples Dunn:

After Penn's death, Pennsylvania slowly drifted away from a colony founded by religion to a secular state dominated by commerce. Many of Penn's legal and political innovations took root, however, as did the Quaker school in Philadelphia for which Penn issued two charters (1689 and 1701). Sometime later, the institution was renamed the William Penn Charter School. "Penn Charter", a well-known secondary day school, is now the oldest Quaker school in the world. Voltaire praised Pennsylvania as the only government in the world that responds to the people and is respectful of minority rights. Penn's "Frame of Government" and his other ideas were later studied by Benjamin Franklin as well as the pamphleteer of the American Revolution, Thomas Paine, whose father was a Quaker. Among Penn's legacies was the unwillingness to force a Quaker majority upon Pennsylvania, allowing his state to develop into a successful "melting pot". In addition, Thomas Jefferson and the founding Fathers adapted Penn's theory of an amendable constitution and his vision that "all Persons are equal under God" informing the federal government following the American Revolution. In addition to Penn's extensive political and religious treatises, he wrote nearly 1,000 maxims, full of wise observations about human nature and morality.

Penn's family retained ownership of the colony of Pennsylvania until the American Revolution. However, William's son and successor, Thomas Penn, and his brother John, renounced their father's faith, and fought to restrict religious freedom (particularly for Catholics and later Quakers as well). Thomas weakened or eliminated the elected assembly's power, and ran the colony instead through his appointed governors. He was a bitter opponent of Benjamin Franklin and Franklin's push for greater democracy in the years leading up to the revolution. Through the infamous Walking Purchase of 1737, the Penns cheated the Lenape out of their lands in the Lehigh Valley.

As a pacifist Quaker, Penn considered the problems of war and peace deeply. He developed a forward-looking project and thoughts for a United States of Europe through the creation of a European Assembly made of deputies who could discuss and adjudicate controversies peacefully. He is therefore considered the first thinker to suggest the creation of a European Parliament and what would become the modern European Union in the late 20th century (See An Essay Towards the Present and Future Peace of Europe (1693)).

Posthumous honours

On 28 November 1984 Ronald Reagan, by Presidential Proclamation 5284 (authorized by an Act of Congress), declared William Penn and his second wife, Hannah Callowhill Penn, each to be an Honorary Citizen of the United States.

A bronze statue of William Penn by Alexander Milne Calder stands atop Philadelphia's City Hall. When installed in 1894, the statue represented the highest point in the city, as City Hall was then the tallest building in Philadelphia. Urban designer Edmund Bacon was known to have said that no gentleman would build taller than the "brim of Billy Penn's hat". This agreement existed for almost 100 years until the city decided to allow taller skyscrapers to be built. In March 1987, the completion of One Liberty Place was the first building to do that. This resulted in a "curse" which lasted from that year on until 2008 when a small statue of William Penn was put on top of the newly built Comcast Center. The Philadelphia Phillies went on to win the 2008 World Series that year.

A lesser-known statue of Penn is located at Penn Treaty Park, on the site where Penn entered into his treaty with the Lenape, which is famously commemorated in the painting Penn's Treaty with the Indians. In 1893, Hajoca Corporation, the nation's largest privately held wholesale distributor of plumbing, heating, and industrial supplies, adopted the statue as its trademark symbol.

The Quaker Oats cereal brand standing "Quaker man" logo, dating back to 1877, was identified in their advertising after 1909 as William Penn, and referred to him as "standard bearer of the Quakers and of Quaker Oats".

In 1946 the logo was changed into a head-and-shoulders portrait of the smiling Quaker Man. The Quaker Oats Company's website currently claims their logo is not a depiction of William Penn.

Bil Keane created the comic Silly Philly for the Philadelphia Bulletin, a juvenile version of Penn, that ran from 1947 to 1961.

Penn was depicted in the 1941 film Penn of Pennsylvania by Clifford Evans.

The William Penn High School for Girls was added to the National Register of Historic Places in 1986.

The William Penn House – a Quaker hostel and seminar center – was named in honor of William Penn when it opened in 1966 to house Quakers visiting Washington, D.C. to partake in the many protests, events and social movements of the era.

Chigwell School, the school he attended, has named one of their four houses after him and now owns several letters and documents in his handwriting.

The former William Penn Primary School, and the successor Penn Wood Primary and Nursery School, in Manor Park, Slough, near to Stoke Park, is named after William Penn.

A pub in Rickmansworth, where Penn lived for a time, is named the Pennsylvanian in his honour, and a picture of him is used as the pub sign.

The Friends' School, Hobart, has named one of their seven six-year classes after him.

The William Penn Society of Whittier College has existed since 1934 as a society on the college campus of Whittier College and continues to this day.

William Penn University in Oskaloosa, Iowa, which was founded by Quaker settlers in 1873, was named in his honor. Penn Mutual, a life insurance company established in 1847, also bears his name.

Streets that have been named after William Penn include Penn Avenue which is a major arterial street in Pittsburgh and Wilkinsburg, PA, as well as Penn Avenue in Scranton, PA and Penn Street in Bristol, PA.

See also
 Penn–Calvert boundary dispute
 Nicholas More

Notes

Further reading
 Dunn, Mary Maples. William Penn: Politics and Conscience (1967)
 Dunn, Richard S. and Mary Maples Dunn, eds. The World of William Penn (1986), essays by scholars
 Endy, Jr., Melvin B. William Penn and Early Quakerism (1973)
 Geiter, Mary K. William Penn (2000)
 Moretta, John. William Penn and the Quaker Legacy (2006)
 Morgan, Edmund S. "The World and William Penn," Proceedings of the American Philosophical Society (1983) 127#5 pp. 291–315 .
 Murphy, Andrew R. William Penn: A Life (2018)
 Nash, Gary B. Quakers and Politics: Pennsylvania, 1681–1726 (1968)
 Peare, Catherine O. William Penn (1957), a standard biography
 Soderlund, Jean R.  "Penn, William" in American National Biography Online (2000) Access Date: Nov 04 2013
 Vulliamy, C.E.  William Penn (1933)

Primary sources
 Dunn, Mary Maples, and Richard S. Dunn et al., eds. The Papers of William Penn (5 vols., 1981–1987)
 Soderlund, Jean R.  et al., eds. William Penn and the Founding of Pennsylvania, 1680–1684: A Documentary History (1983)

External links

 Lesson Plan: William Penn's Peaceable Kingdom 
 William Penn Appleton and Klos Biography
 The Life of William Penn by M. L. Weems, 1829. Full-text free to read and search version of Tim Unterreiner biography from 1829 original published in Philadelphia.
 William Penn, Visionary Proprietor by Tuomi J. Forrest, at the University of Virginia
 William Penn, America's First Great Champion for Liberty and Peace by Jim Powell
 William Penn by Bill Samuel
 Penn's Holy Experiment: The Seed of a Nation
 Penn in the Tower of London
 Hidden London Penn in the Tower
 original version of this article (copied with permission)
 "Pennsylvania's Anarchist Experiment: 1681–1690," Prof. Murray N. Rothbard, excerpt from Conceived in Liberty, Vol. 1 (Auburn, Alabama: The Ludwig von Mises Institute, 1999)
 
 Penn Treaty Museum

Penn's works
 
 
 
 No Cross, No Crown (1669).  2nd edition published in 1682. Written during his imprisonment in the Tower of London.
 The Christian Quaker, and his divine testimony vindicated by Scripture, reason, and authorities, against the injurious attempts ... lately made ... to render him odiously inconsistent with Christianity and Civil Society. In II. Parts., (1674).(part one written by Penn; Part two by George Whitehead, 1673).
 True Spiritual Liberty (1681)
 Some Fruits of Solitude in Reflections and Maxims (1682)
 Frame Of Government Of Pennsylvania (1682) From the Avalon Project, Yale Law School.
 Letter to his wife, Gulielma (1682)
 Early Quaker writings contains several documents by Penn and his wife.
 A Key (1692)
 Primitive Christianity Revived  (1696)
 Preface to George Fox's Journal (1694)
 The Rise and Progress of the People Called Quakers by William Penn (1905 ed.)
 An Essay towards the Present and Future Peace of Europe by the Establishment of a European Dyet, Parliament or Estates (1693)
  Full text at Internet Archive (archive.org)
 Dunn, Mary Maples, Dunn, Richard S., Bronner, Edwin, and Fraser, David. The papers of William Penn, 5 volumes. Philadelphia: University of Pennsylvania Press, 1981–87.

1644 births
1718 deaths
17th-century English businesspeople
18th-century English people
Alumni of Christ Church, Oxford
American Christian pacifists
American Christian writers
American city founders
American slave owners
American slave traders
British Christian writers
British slave owners
Burials in Berkshire
Converts to Quakerism
English Christian pacifists
English Quakers
Fellows of the Royal Society
Free speech activists
Hall of Fame for Great Americans inductees
History of Christianity in the United States
History of religion in the United States
Inmates of Fleet Prison
English emigrants
William
People educated at Chigwell School
People of colonial Pennsylvania
Prisoners in the Tower of London
Quakers from Pennsylvania
Quaker theologians
Quaker writers
William Penn